Tungsten tetrafluoride is an inorganic compound with the formula WF4.  This little studied solid has been invoked, together with tungsten pentafluoride, as an intermediate in the chemical vapor deposition of tungsten films using tungsten hexafluoride.

Structure 
Tungsten tetrafluoride was found to have polymeric structure based on Mössbauer spectroscopy.

Preparation
It has been prepared by treatment of the coordination complex WCl4(MeCN)2 with AsF3. It has been produced by from the reaction of WF6 and a W filament at 600-800 °C.

Reactions 
The compound can be re-oxidized to W(VI) compounds by treatment with fluorine and chlorine:
WF4  +  X2   →   WF4X2

Upon heating, it disproportionates to WF6 and tungsten metal.

References

Tungsten halides
Fluorides